Leander Paes defeated Marcos Ondruska in the final, 7–5, 2–6, 6–4 to win the boys' singles tennis title at the 1990 Wimbledon Championships.

Seeds

  Martin Damm (second round)
  Marcos Ondruska (final)
  Oliver Fernández (second round)
  Hernán Gumy (third round)
  Sébastien Leblanc (third round)
  Andriy Medvedev (third round)
  Ivan Baron (semifinals)
  Pavel Gazda (quarterfinals)
  Jan Kodeš (first round)
  Clinton Marsh (first round)
  Leander Paes (champion)
  Narathorn Srichaphan (quarterfinals)
  Mårten Renström (third round)
  Andrei Rybalko (second round)
  Saša Hiršzon (quarterfinals)
  Grant Doyle (second round)

Draw

Finals

Top half

Section 1

Section 2

Bottom half

Section 3

Section 4

References

External links

Boys' Singles
Wimbledon Championship by year – Boys' singles